The 132nd Wing, sometimes written 132d Wing, (132 WG) is a United States Air Force unit assigned to the Iowa Air National Guard and located at Des Moines Air National Guard Base, Iowa. The 132nd's World War II predecessor unit, the 365th Fighter Group was a IX Fighter Command unit, serving in the European Theater of Operations. The 365th, known as the "Hell Hawks", was one of the most successful P-47 Thunderbolt fighter groups of the Ninth Air Force when it came to air combat. The 365th was awarded two Distinguished Unit Citations; Order of the Day, Belgium Army; Belgium Fourragère, and the Belgium Croix de Guerre. The 365th Fighter Group flew its last mission on 8 May 1945. After having operated manned fighter aircraft for all of its prior history, the wing was equipped with the MQ-9 Reaper unmanned aerial vehicle in 2013.

Units
The units of the 132nd Wing include:
 132nd Operations Group 
 124th Attack Squadron (MQ-9 Reaper) Tail Code: "IA"
 132nd Operations Support Squadron
 168th Cyberspace Operations Squadron
 132nd Intelligence, Surveillance and Reconnaissance (ISR) Group
 232nd Intelligence Squadron
 233rd Intelligence Squadron
 132nd Intelligence Support Squadron
 132nd Mission Support Group
 132nd Communications Squadron
 132nd Security Forces Squadron
 132nd Force Support Squadron
 132nd Logistics Readiness Squadron
 132nd Medical Group

History

World War II

Constituted as the 365th Fighter Group on 27 April 1943. Activated on 15 May 1943. Trained with P-47's. Moved to RAF Gosfield, England in December 1943. Assigned to Ninth Air Force. It was several weeks before the 365th received a full complement of 75 P-47D Thunderbolts and mid-February 1944 before they were placed on operational status. Their first mission, flown on 22 February, was a bomber support sweep of short duration over enemy-held territory.

Early missions were flown in support of Eighth Air Force B-17 and B-24 bomber operations and on one of these on 2 March, the 365th had its first encounter with enemy fighters in the Bastogne area, resulting in the loss of one Thunderbolt and claims of six of the enemy shot down. Oberstleutnant Egon Mayer, one of the most successful Luftwaffe aces flying in the West with 102 victories, fell in this battle.

On 5 March, with only nine missions to its credit, the group moved south to RAF Beaulieu in Hampshire. The group was stood down three days after arrival so that it could undertake a two-week intensive course in ground attack and fighter-bombing. After training, the 365th flew dive-bombing missions to attack such targets as bridges, aerodromes, rail facilities, gun positions, and V-weapon sites prior to the invasion of the Continent.

On D-Day, its duties were attacking gun emplacements and communications facilities behind the bridgehead. Two P-47s were lost. On the following day when 12 separate squadron-sized missions were flown five aircraft failed to return.

An unusual accident occurred on 9 June when two P-47s being delivered to Beaulieu by ferry pilots landed on different runways at the same time and collided at the runway intersection with one pilot being killed.

The 365th was one of the most successful P-47 groups of the Ninth Air Force when it came to air combat, and a total of 29 enemy aircraft were credited as shot down during the four months the group operated from Beaulieu. On 25 June, the 365th had one of its best days when eight enemy fighter-bombers were destroyed. On 2 July, Lieutenant Colonel Robert L. Coffey, Jr., the Air Executive, became the Ninth Air Force's third Thunderbolt ace. As with other P-47 groups, losses were modest until ground attack became a regular task in June. All told, 24 P-47s were 'missing in action' during their stay at Beaulieu.

The 365th Group began its move to the Continent on 21 June, the first squadron taking up residence at Azeville, France (A-71) on 26 June, the last moving out of Beaulieu on 28 June and the rear party on 2 July providing tactical air support in support of U.S. First Army. On the continent, the group moved rapidly from one airfield to another, eventually winding up near Fritzlar, Germany (Y-86) on VE-Day.

After the end of hostilities, the 365th Fighter Group took part in the disarmament program until June, then returned to the United States in September 1945, being inactivated at Camp Myles Standish, near Taunton, Massachusetts on 22 September 1945.

Iowa Air National Guard

The redesignated group was formed with three fighter squadrons, consisting of the 124th Fighter Squadron at Des Moines; the 174th Fighter Squadron at Sioux City, and the 175th Fighter Squadron at Sioux Falls, South Dakota.  Engaged in routine training exercises, and was upgraded to F-84B Thunderjet jet aircraft in early 1948.

The War Department authorized the establishment of Air National Guard units in all 48 states, with three units comprising a wing based in Sioux Falls, Sioux City and Des Moines, Iowa. The Air National Guard wing was organized by Colonel Frederick C. Gray, Jr. who was a veteran of the RAF and 8th Air Force during World War II. Colonel Gray, based in Des Moines, Iowa, acted as wing senior instructor for the three Air National Guard units which comprised the wing. Col. Gray's appointment was made by Brigadier General Charles H. Grahl, Iowa Adjutant General, on 26 June 1946.

In 1946, Oscar Randolph Fladmark was appointed to the rank of Captain and the duty of a Flight Commander with the Air National Guard 175th Fighter Squadron based in Sioux Falls. Fladmark's appointment was approved by Colonel E.A. Beckwith, South Dakota Adjutant General in Rapid City, South Dakota on 20 September 1946.

Korean War federalization
Activated to Federal Service during the Korean War, sent to Dow AFB, Maine. Used by TAC to train replacement pilots in F-51D Mustang ground support operations, also deployed unit members to Japan and Korea to fly combat missions.

In February 1951, Colonel Frederick Gray was reunited with a flying friend Captain Oscar Fladmark when he reactiviated the 35th Fighter-Interceptor Wing. Captain Oscar Fladmark was assigned to the 35th Fighter-Interceptor Wing, which was reactivated by Colonel Frederick Gray. The 35th Fighter-Interceptor Wing was a component of the 5th Air Force, Far East Forces. During the Korean War. 

The Wing was moved to Alexandria AFB, Louisiana in May 1952 again with F-51s replacing the federalized Oklahoma ANG 137th Fighter-Bomber Wing which was deployed to France.  Performed training as a tactical fighter unit until relieved from active service and returned to Iowa ANG jurisdiction in January 1953.

Cold War

During 1952, over one million dollars of federally funded improvements were added to the Des Moines airport. The work included the addition of 1,800 feet to the main runway and 3,480 feet of taxiways to better accommodate the wing receiving jet aircraft upon their return to peacetime service. After returning to Des Moines, the wing was re-equipped with F-80C Shooting Star jet fighter-bombers and returned to normal peacetime training committed to Tactical Air Command.  It was later upgraded with newer F-84E Thunderjets in 1955.  The wing was transferred to Air Defense Command in July 1958, becoming an all-weather F-86L Sabre Interceptor squadron, its new mission being the air defense of Des Moines and eastern Iowa.

In June 1960, the Lincoln, Nebraska-based 173rd FIS was reassigned to the new Nebraska ANG 155th Fighter-Interceptor Group when the squadron was expanded to a group-level organization.  In a similar reassignment, the Sioux City-based 174th FIS was reassigned to the 185th Tactical Fighter Group on 30 September 1962.  The F-86Ls of the remaining 124th FIS were replaced  
with F-89J Scorpion Interceptors, which the squadron flew until the summer of 1969.

The 132nd was transferred back to TAC in 1969, being re-equipped with second-line F-84F Thunderstreaks, the standard TAC aircraft for its Air National Guard-gained squadrons at the time. The 132nd upgraded to the F-100D Super Sabre aircraft, which were returning from South Vietnam in 1971, and being transferred to the ANG to replace the subsonic F-84's. The wing began receiving new and transferred A-7D Corsair II ground attack aircraft in 1976 when the National Guard Bureau began modernizing the ANG with frontline aircraft after the drawdown of the regular Air Force following the end of the Vietnam War.

With the retirement of the A-7Ds in the late 1980s, the wing was upgraded to Block 42 F-16C Fighting Falcons in 1990.  From 1998 to 2004, as part of the Air Expeditionary Force concept, the wing had an unprecedented six overseas contingency deployments to patrol the No-Fly Zone over Iraq in Operations Northern and Southern Watch. Two of the six contingency deployments occurred within a ten-month period, attesting to the unit's professionalism and high state of readiness.

Modern era

Immediately following the events of 11 September 2001, the 124th Fighter Squadron's F-16s, pilots, and maintenance members were placed on alert, poised to defend Iowans and all Americans against any possible attacks. After 9/11 the unit's F-16's were prepared to launch within minutes in the event of a "scramble" order – 24/7. The unit has also provided continuous Combat Air Patrols during Presidential visits.

The unit was deployed to Al Udeid AB, Qatar in 2005 in support of Operation Enduring Freedom and Operation Iraqi Freedom. The squadron performed in an exceptional manner, exhibiting an impressive array of capabilities. Outstanding leadership and superb aircraft maintenance skills produced 456 sorties and 3145 flying hours in austere conditions. Total flying hours during this contingency equaled to over three-fourths of a year's normal flying allocation in only 52 days.

The Wing was validated as the "Best of the Best" following its Operation Readiness Inspection in 2004, by Air Combat Command (ACC). Seventy-three percent of 154 rated areas were graded as Outstanding or Excellent. The Excellent rating was received in each of the four major rated areas of Initial Response, Employment, Mission Support, and Ability to Survive and Operate, a precedent that had not been accomplished by a fighter wing in recent inspections. The 132nd Fighter Wing's rating was one of the highest achieved by an Active Duty, Air Force Reserve, or Air National Guard wing in several years. In addition, the Logistics Readiness Squadron received the 2005 Air Reserve Component Base Logistics Activity of the Year Award and the Maintenance Group received the 2005 Air National Guard's Maintenance Effectiveness Award. As a result of its outstanding efforts and commitment to excellence, the Wing was awarded its seventh Air Force Outstanding Unit Award.

Less than a week after Hurricane Katrina, 12 members of the 132nd Medical Group teamed up with 19 members of the Sioux City 185th Air Refueling Wing and headed south to bring aid to those injured or sick because of the storm. The team treated 80 to 100 patients a day with ailments ranging from minor cuts to dehydration and acute skin infections caused by exposure to bacteria-laden sewer water.

The 132nd Fighter Wing received the Air Force Outstanding Unit Award in 2009. It was the eighth time the unit was the recipient of this prestigious award.

Mission Change

Congressional actions removed the wing's fighters from the base, with the transition beginning in FY 2013. The last regularly scheduled F-16 flights occurred in August 2013, after which the unit's 21 F-16s were transferred to the New Jersey Air National Guard's 177th Fighter Wing at Atlantic City Air National Guard Base.

It was initially suggested to transition the wing to the A-10 Thunderbolt II however in light of the increased need for cyber warfare, intelligence, and RPA capacity by the U.S. Air Force as well as highly technical skills and training that went with this mission the Iowa legislature lobbied successfully for the 132nd to reclassify into the ISR and RPA mission.

The loss of the Falcons created some debate over the base's status as an aeronautical base with a true flying mission, and the airport threatened legal action to begin charging a full market-value lease. This was addressed by the reassignment of UH-60 Blackhawk helicopters from Company C, 2nd Battalion, 147th Aviation, Iowa Army National Guard, from Boone, IA to the base, occupying the hangars that held fixed-wing Air Force fighters for 70 years.

Because of the excellent work during its challenging mission change, the 132d Wing was selected for its 11th Air Force Outstanding Unit Award in August 2016. As it brought all of its new missions to full operating capacity under budget and ahead of schedule, the Wing was awarded its 12th decoration of the award at the end of 2017.

Current Missions
The wing moved from a manned fighter wing to a multi-mission unit, including the operation of Remotely Piloted Aircraft, an ISR group, and a cyber operations squadron, adding them to the unit's distributed training operations center.

The 132nd Operations Group operates the MQ-9 Reaper, a remotely piloted aircraft. Aircrew based and physically located in Des Moines carry out missions in all corners of the world. These aircrews provide real-time full-motion video and flexible strike capabilities to combatant commanders around the globe.

The 132nd ISR Group provides intelligence, surveillance and reconnaissance research and analysis capabilities to enable combatant commanders' planning and operational decision making. Through the use of intelligence information and training, the analysts of this group determine the strengths and weaknesses of an enemy target complex and pass that information off to Weaponeers who determine the best aim point and weapon to achieve the desired target destruction. As part of the 25th Air Force, the 132 ISRG received the Air Force Meritorious Unit Award in late 2017, 2018, and 2020 for participation in targeting operations worldwide.

The 168th Cyberspace Operations Squadron is tasked with analyzing and protecting networks and systems by determining vulnerabilities and implementing solutions.

The Distributed Training Operations Center (DTOC) is the Iowa Air National Guard center for Distributed Mission Operations (located in Des Moines). It operates as a wing detachment. Distributed Mission Operations (DMO) is a component of the Air Force Training Transformation initiative. While the center organizes DMO events primarily for Air National Guard and Air Force Reserve Command pilots, DTOC also facilitates training between Air National Guard fighter pilots and warfighters in the U.S. Army, Air Force Reserve, Navy, and allied forces. The center also has the capability to include non-virtual assets into the simulation, allowing pilots in physical aircraft to participate in the exercises. Such virtual training exercises save the Air Force substantial funds over gathering assets for real-life exercises.

Lineage

Constituted as 365th Fighter Group on 27 April 1943
 Activated on 15 May 1943
 Inactivated on 22 September 1945
 Re-designated 132nd Fighter Group, and allotted to Iowa Air National Guard on 24 May 1946
 Extended federal recognition on 23 Aug 1946
 Ordered into active service on 1 April 1951
 Re-designated 132nd Fighter-Bomber Group 1 June 1951
 Relieved from active service and returned, less personnel and equipment, to Iowa ANG, 1 January 1953
 Re-designated: 132nd Fighter-Interceptor Group on 1 Jul 1958
 Re-designated: 132nd Tactical Fighter Group on 2 Aug 1969
 Status changed from Group to Wing, 15 Mar 1992
 Re-designated: 132nd Fighter Wing on 15 Mar 1992
 Re-designated: 132nd Wing on 7 Mar 2015

Assignments
 I Fighter Command, 15 May 1943
 Attached to: Philadelphia Fighter Wing, 19 July – 4 December 1943
 70th Fighter Wing
 Attached to: IX Air Service Command, 22 December 1943
 84th Fighter Wing
 Attached to: IX Tactical Air Command, 1 August 1944
 70th Fighter Wing
 Attached to: IX Tactical Air Command, 1 October 1944
 XIX Tactical Air Command, 16 January 1945
 IX Tactical Air Command, 1 February – 11 September 1945
 Army Service Forces (for inactivation), 20–22 September 1945
 71st Fighter Wing, 23 August 1946
 131st Composite Wing, 1 November 1950
 Iowa Air National Guard, 1 March 1951
 Gained by: Tactical Air Command
 Strategic Air Command, 1 April 1951
 Tactical Air Command, 1 November 1951
 Iowa Air National Guard, 1 January 1953
 Gained by: Tactical Air Command
 Gained by: Air Defense Command, 1 July 1958
 Gained by: Tactical Air Command, 2 August 1969
 Gained by: Air Combat Command, 1 June 1992

Components

World War II
 386th Fighter Squadron (D5), 15 May 1943 – 22 September 1945
 387th Fighter Squadron (B4), 15 May 1943 – 22 September 1945
 388th Fighter Squadron (C4), 15 May 1943 – 22 September 1945

Iowa Air National Guard
 132nd Operations Group, 15 March 1992 – Present
 124th Fighter Squadron 24 May 1946 – Present
 174th Fighter Squadron, 24 May 1946 – 30 September 1962 (GSU Sioux City IA)
 173rd Fighter (later Fighter-Interceptor) Squadron, 24 May 1946 – 1 Jul 1960 (Nebraska ANG)

Stations

 Richmond AAB, Virginia, 15 May 1943
 Langley Field, Virginia, 19 July 1943
 Dover AAFld, Delaware, ; 11 August 1943
 Richmond AAB, Virginia, 18 November – 4 December 1943
 RAF Gosfield (AAF-154), England, 22 December 1943
 RAF Beaulieu (AAF-408), England, 5 March 1944
 Azeville Airfield (A-7), France, 28 June 1944
 Lignerolles Airfield (A-12), France, 15 August 1944
 Bretigny Airfield (A-48), France, 3 September 1944
 Juvincourt Airfield (A-68), France, 15 September 1944
 Chievres Airfield (A-84), Belgium, 4 October 1944

 Metz Airfield (Y-34), France, 27 December 1944
 Florennes/Juzaine Airfield (A-78), Belgium, 30 January 1945
 Aachen Airfield (Y-46), Germany, 16 March 1945
 Fritzlar Airfield (Y-86), Germany, 13 April 1945
 Suippes, France, (Ground Echelon) c. 29 July 1945
 Antwerp, Belgium, (Ground Echelon) c. 22 August – 11 September 1945
 Camp Myles Standish, Massachusetts, 20–22 September 1945
 Des Moines MAP (later Des Moines Air National Guard Base), Iowa, 23 Aug 1946–present
 Operated from: Dow AFB, Maine, 1 April 1951 – 5 November 1952
 Operated from: Alexandria AFB, Louisiana, 5 November 1952 – 1 January 1953

Aircraft

 P-47 Thunderbolt, 1943–1945
 P-51D Mustang, 1946-1949
 F-84B Thunderjet, 1949-1951
 F-51D Mustang, 1951-1953
 F-80C Shooting Star, 1953-1956
 F-84E Thunderjet, 1956-1958

 F-86L Sabre Interceptor, 1958-1962
 F-89J Scorpion, 1962-1969
 F-84F Thunderstreak, 1969-1971
 F-100 Super Sabre, 1971-1977
 A-7D Corsair II, 1977-1992
 F-16 Fighting Falcon, 1992–2013
 MQ-9 Reaper, 2013–present

Commanders

References

 
 
 Rogers, B. (2006). United States Air Force Unit Designations Since 1978. 
 Maurer, Maurer (1983). Air Force Combat Units of World War II. Maxwell AFB, Alabama: Office of Air Force History. .
 Freeman, Roger A. (1994) UK Airfields of the Ninth: Then and Now 1994. After the Battle 
 Freeman, Roger A. (1996) The Ninth Air Force in Colour: UK and the Continent-World War Two. After the Battle 
 Maurer, Maurer (1983). Air Force Combat Units of World War II. Maxwell AFB, Alabama: Office of Air Force History. .
 Johnson, David C. (1988), U.S. Army Air Forces Continental Airfields (ETO), D-Day to V-E Day; Research Division, USAF Historical Research Center, Maxwell AFB, Alabama.

External links
 
 remembrances from the 365th Fighter Group Association Website

Wings of the United States Air National Guard
Military units and formations in Iowa
132
Military units and formations established in 1950
Military units and formations established in 1943